Sangathalaivan is a 2021 Indian Tamil-language drama film written and directed by Manimaran. Based on the novel Thariyudan by Bharathinathan, the film stars Samuthirakani, Karunas and Ramya Subramanian in the lead roles. Produced by Vetrimaaran via Grass Root Film Company, it was released on 26 February 2021.

Plot
The story follows the life of Rangan, a powerloom worker. A tragic incident leads to Rangan's first brush with Communism, and its representative, Sivalingam. Rangan is unsure of Communism at first; he doesn't even want to be seen aligning with Communists for fear of repercussion from his capitalist employer Current office Govindaraj.

Cast

Production 
The film was announced in October 2017, with director Manimaran and producer Vetrimaaran announcing that they would make a film starring Samuthirakani. Based on the novel Thariyudan, the story was to be set in the areas of Salem, Erode and Tirupur, and was said to focus on the lives of handloom weavers and the struggles they face. Ramya Subramanian was cast in the film after being recommended by Velraj and shot for the film in rural Tamil Nadu.

Soundtrack
Soundtrack was composed by Robert Sargunam.
Sarvesa – Jayamoorthy
Pudhu Vidha – Saindhavi
Porattam Illamal – Teejay, Arunraja Kamaraj

Release 
The film was released theatrically across Tamil Nadu on 26 February 2021. A critic from The Hindu noted "this idealistic take on an ideology lacks verve" and that the film "fails to sell its politics convincingly". A reviewer from the Times of India stated "despite having a few interestingly-written characters, Sangathalaivan is another half-baked attempt which relies more on conveying ideologies."

Sify called the film "average", adding "the problem is that the director fails to pack the content of the novel within a two-hour film. The editing is shoddy and we get the feel that several scenes were chopped off to speed up the proceedings." In contrast, News Today noted "Sangathalaivan provides a good watch. The characters shown with various emotions engrosses audience. Had it been less preachy, this sure to leave an impact." Likewise, Cinema Express noted it was "a slow-burn drama that give us the pleasant feeling of reading a novel from the 90s."

References

External links 
 

2021 films
2020s Tamil-language films
Indian vigilante films
Films shot in Chennai
Indian drama films
Films about social issues in India
2021 drama films
Films based on Indian novels